Encyclopedia Sindhiana, published by the Sindhi Language Authority, is a general knowledge encyclopedia specially covering a wide range of information regarding Sindh. A total of fifteen volumes are planned to be published. Eleven volumes have been published so far. About eighty percent of the content is about Sindh, while the rest covers different important topics relating to the world and universe.

History 

The Encyclopedia Sindhiana is a project of the Sindhi Language Authority. The project was initially started under the supervision of  Ghulam Ali Allana but was soon discontinued due to unknown reasons. It was restarted during chairpersonship of Dr Fahmida Hussain in July 2008 to 13 March 2015. Now it is working under the Chairmanship of Dr. Abdul Ghafoor Memon. Badar Abro was made first Project Director of Encyclopedia Sindhiana, who was later replaced by Muhammad Usman Memon .

Volumes
As of yet eight volumes have been published. The first volume was published in 2009, while latest addition to this is eleventh volume which was published in August 2017. Collectively they cover first 29 letters of Sindhi alphabet.

Volume 1
This volume was published in 2009 and covers first three letters of Sindhi alphabet. It has 3500 entries and is spread upon about 650 pages.

Volume 2
The second volume consisting of 728 pages includes about 2571 entries based upon six letters of Sindhi alphabet from four to nine. This volume was published in 2010.

Volume 3
This volume, published in 2011, covers two letters and has 2533 entries. Number of pages in this volume is 700.

Volume 4

Volume four covers next seven letters of Sindhi alphabet and has 2033 entries. This volume has 608 pages and was published in 2012.

Volume 5

Volume five, published in 2012, covers six letters of Sindhi alphabet  and has 1930 entries.

Volume 6

This volume was published in 2013. It contains entries from three letters.

Volumes 7 and 8

These two volumes collectively cover one letter of Sindhi alphabetand have 2438 entries in total. Both were published in 2013.

Volume 10
This volume of Sindhiana was published in 2016. it contains entries of Sindhi alphabet and have 508 pages.

See also
 History of Sindh
 Sindhology
 Chach Nama
 Sindhi Wikipedia

References

External links
http://www.encyclopediasindhiana.org/

Sindhology
Encyclopedias of culture and ethnicity
Sindhi-language encyclopedias
2009 non-fiction books
Pakistani encyclopedias
21st-century encyclopedias
Pakistani online encyclopedias